V. Shircy (born 31 May 1960) is the judge of Kerala High Court. The High Court of Kerala is the highest court in the Indian state of Kerala and in the Union Territory of Lakshadweep. The High Court of Kerala is headquartered at Ernakulam, Kochi.

Early life
Shircy graduated from St. Teresa's College, Ernakulam in 1981 and obtained Law Degree from Government Law College, Ernakulam.

Career
Shircy enrolled as an Advocate in 1984 and started practicing in Thodupuzha. On 11 July 1988 she joined Kerala Civil Judicial Service as Munsiff at Pathanamthitta. Subsequently served as Munsiff-Magistrate at Perambra, as Sub Judge at Thrissur, Kozhikode, Kochi and Kottayam, as Chief Judicial Magistrate at Thrissur, as Judge Motor Accidents Claims Tribunal at Ottapalam, as Judge, Family Court at Kozhikode and Thrissur, as Additional District Judge at Ernakulam, Kozhikode and Thrissur, as Principal District Judge at Manjeri, Thalassery and Thiruvananthapuram and as the Chairperson of the Administrative Committee of Sree Padmanabha Swamy Temple, Thiruvananthapuram. On 5 October 2016 she was appointed as additional judge of Kerala High Court and became permanent from 16 March 2018

References

External links
 High Court of Kerala

Living people
Judges of the Kerala High Court
21st-century Indian judges
1960 births